The Emmanuel Baptist Church in downtown Alexandria, Louisiana was built in 1950.  It was added to the National Register of Historic Places on November 21, 2001.

The building was designed by New Orleans architects Favrot & Reed. Jacoby Stained Glass Studios of St. Louis also contributed to the project.

In 1960 the building was expanded by an addition to the rear, and its education building was extensively remodeled.

A family life center was added to Emmanuel in the late 1970s under the leadership of then pastor Schuyler M. Batson (1923–1996). It was built by Buddy Tudor's family-owned construction company in Pineville.

References

Churches completed in 1950
Buildings and structures in Alexandria, Louisiana
Churches on the National Register of Historic Places in Louisiana
Gothic Revival church buildings in Louisiana
Churches in Rapides Parish, Louisiana
National Register of Historic Places in Rapides Parish, Louisiana
Southern Baptist Convention churches